Y'all (pronounced  ) is a contraction of you and all, sometimes combined as you-all. Y'all is the main second-person plural pronoun in Southern American English, with which it is most frequently associated, though it also appears in some other English varieties, including African-American English and South African Indian English. It is usually used as a plural second-person pronoun, but whether it is exclusively plural is a perennial subject of discussion.

History
The spelling you-all in second-person plural pronoun usage was first recorded in 1824. The earliest two attestations with the spelling y'all date from 1856, followed by an 1858 appearance in the Southern Literary Messenger (published in Richmond, Virginia). Although appearing in print sporadically in the second half of the nineteenth century in the Southern United States, usage did not expand to common usage across the entire region until the twentieth century.

It is not certain whence and with whom usage originated- speculation includes introduction by Scots-Irish, evolving from the Ulster Scots term ye aw, or a calque of Gullah and Caribbean creole via dialects of African-American English- however, the general linguistic consensus holds y'all is likely an original form, deriving from a processes of grammar and morphological change rather than directly transferred from any other English dialect.

Y'all manifested at different times in various dialects of English, including Southern American English and South African Indian English, suggesting parallel, independent development, while emergence in Southern and African-American Vernacular English closely correlates in time and place.

The spelling y'all is the most prevalent in print, ten times that of ya'll; much less common spelling variants include yall, yawl, and yo-all.

Linguistic characteristics
Functionally, the emergence of y'all can be traced to the merging of singular ("thou") and plural ("ye") second-person pronouns in Early Modern English. Y'all thus fills in the gap created by the absence of a separate second-person plural pronoun in standard modern English. The contracted stressed form- you-all -is converted to an unstressed form.

The usage of y'all can satisfy several grammatical functions, including an associative plural, a collective pronoun, an institutional pronoun, and an indefinite pronoun.

Y'all can in some instances serve as a "tone-setting device to express familiarity and solidarity." When used in the singular, y'all can be used to convey a feeling of warmth towards the addressee. In this way, singular usage of y'all differs from French, Russian or German, where plural forms can be used for formal singular instances.

Singular usage
There is historic disagreement whether y'all is primarily or exclusively plural, with debate steming from the late nineteenth century to the present. While some Southerners hold y'all is only properly used as a plural pronoun, counter evidence suggests usage include singular references, particularly amongst non-Southerners.

H. L. Mencken, in recognizing the typical plural reference of y'all, acknowledged observation of the singular reference, writing-

Possessive forms
The existence of the genitive (or possessive) form y'all's indicates that y'all functions as a pronoun as opposed to a phrasal element. The possessive form of y'all has not been standardized; numerous forms can be found, including y'alls, y'all's, y'alls's, you all's, your all's, and all of y'all's.

All y'all
All y'all, all of y'all, and alls y'all are used by some speakers to indicate a larger group than is necessarily implied by simply y'all. All y'all can also be used for emphasis; the existence of this etymologically pleonastic form is further evidence that speakers now perceive y'all as a grammatically indivisible unit.

Regional usage

United States
Y'all has been called "perhaps the most distinctive of all grammatical characteristics" of Southern American English, as well as its most prominent characteristic. Linguist Walt Wolfram and English professor Jeffrey Reaser wrote, "No word in the American English vocabulary probably carries as much regional capital." People who move to the South from other regions often adopt the usage, even when other regional usages are not adopted. Outside the southern United States, y'all is most closely associated with African-American Vernacular English. African Americans took Southern usages with them during the twentieth-century exodus from the South to cities in the northeastern United States and other places within the nation. In urban African-American communities outside of the South, the usage of y'all is prominent.

The use of y'all as the dominant second person-plural pronoun is not necessarily universal in the Southern United States. In some dialects of the Ozarks and Great Smoky Mountains, for example, it is common to hear you'uns (a contraction of "you ones") used instead. Other forms have also been used increasingly in the South, including you guys.

A survey conducted in 1996 reported 49% of non-Southerners and 84% of Southerners used y'all or you-all in conversation, with a subsequent 1994 survey returning a 5% increase by both groups.

South Africa
In South Africa, y'all appears across all varieties of South African Indian English. Its lexical similarity to the y'all of the United States may be coincidental.

Rest of the world
Y'all appears in other dialects of English, including Maori English in New Zealand, and dialects of St. Helena, Tristan da Cunha, and Newfoundland and Labrador.

See also
 

English personal pronouns
Ye (pronoun)
Yinz

References

American English
Second-person plural pronouns in English
Slang of the Southern United States
African-American slang